The 2022 Davidson Wildcats baseball team represented Davidson College during the 2022 NCAA Division I baseball season. It was the program's 121st baseball season, and their 7th season the Atlantic 10 Conference. The regular season began on February 18 and concluded on May 21, 2022.

The season was the program's first ever season winning the Atlantic 10 regular season championship, and the program's first ever season where they won 40 or more games. Additionally, Davidson was one of only two Division I baseball programs (the other being UC Santa Barbara) to win every weekend series during the season. The entered the Atlantic 10 Tournament as the top seed, where they won their opening game against George Mason, however, the program lost consecutively to VCU and Richmond, causing them to finish third place in the tournament. 

Davidson did not earn an at-large bid into the NCAA Tournament.

Preseason

Coaches Poll 
The Atlantic 10 baseball coaches' poll was released on February 15, 2022. Davidson was picked to finish fifth in the Atlantic 10.

Preseason Atlantic 10 awards and honors
Trevor Candelaria and Blake Hely were named to the All-Atlantic 10 Preseason team.

Personnel

Roster

Coaching Staff

Source

Schedule and results

Schedule Notes

Tournaments

Atlantic 10 Tournament

Statistics
Statistics current through May 20, 2022.

Team batting

Team pitching

Individual batting 
Note: leaders must meet the minimum requirement of 2 PA/G and 75% of games played

Individual pitching
Note: leaders must meet the minimum requirement of 1 IP/G

Rankings

References

External links 
 Davidson College Baseball

Davidson
Davidson Wildcats baseball seasons
Davidson Wildcats baseball
Atlantic 10 Conference baseball champion seasons